Pavel Núñez commonly referred to as Pavel is a singer from Santo Domingo, Dominican Republic with influences of Rock en Español, Latin pop, and Dominican traditional music. Best known for his international hit single "Te Di", and other favorites like "Betania" and "Paso a Paso". He released his album "El Tiempo del Viento" early 2010

References

21st-century Dominican Republic male singers
Year of birth missing (living people)
Living people
Latin music songwriters